Luis Oquendo Valhuerdi (March 24, 1925 – August 25, 1992) was a Cuban-American actor who was well known for his acting on radio before going into television and film.

Born in Havana, he permanently immigrated to Florida in 1965. In 1969, he participated in the recording of Cachucha y Ramon a radio soap opera that paired him with actress Norma Zuñiga.

In 1977–1979, he reached the pinnacle of popularity as the grandfather Antonio in the PBS series ¿Que Pasa USA?. He appeared in the movie Guaguasi in 1979 opposite his Que Pasa co-star Velia Martínez and in 1990 in the movie A Show of Force with Andy García and Robert Duvall. In the 1990s he was in the Spanish soap operas, Marielena and El Magnate. He suffered a heart attack while being operated on and died in 1992, while suffering from stomach cancer.

Filmography

References

External links
 ¿Que Pasa USA? website

1925 births
1992 deaths
Cuban male television actors
Cuban radio actors
20th-century Cuban male actors
Male actors from Havana
Cuban emigrants to the United States